The 2003 Hel van het Mergelland was the 30th edition of the Volta Limburg Classic cycle race and was held on 5 April 2003. The race started and finished in Eijsden. The race was won by Wim Van Huffel.

General classification

References

2003
2003 in road cycling
2003 in Dutch sport